The Nature of Nicholas is a 2002 Canadian coming-of-age drama film directed by Jeff Erbach, starring Jeff Sutton, David Turnbull and Tom McCamus.

Cast
 Jeff Sutton as Nicholas
 David Turnbull as Bobby
 Tom McCamus as Father
 Ardith Boxall as Mother
 Robert Huculak as Roy
 Katherine Lee Raymond as Jenna
 Samantha Hill as Vicki

Release
The film premiered at the Montreal World Film Festival on 24 August 2002.

Reception
Dennis Harvey of Variety called the film "accomplished if not entirely satisfying". Ryan Cracknell of Film Threat wrote that the film "takes a more in-your-face approach where the transformation into adulthood is looked at with a combination of fear, curiosity and confusion." Ray Conlogue of The Globe and Mail rated the film 2.5 stars out of 4 and wrote that while the film "has its slow patches", and "expects more of his inexperienced lead actor than he can deliver", it is an "honest, and often moving, personal film".

Joe O'Connell of the Austin American-Statesman wrote that "what begins as a compelling coming-of-age story ends with a twisted crime scene of metaphor." Susan Walker of the Toronto Star wrote that while the film "exceedingly slow-paced film that veers wildly between documentary-style naturalism and total improbability."

References

External links
 
 

2002 films
2002 drama films
2000s coming-of-age films
Canadian coming-of-age drama films
2000s coming-of-age drama films